O'Leary is a town located in Prince County, Prince Edward Island. Its population in the 2016 Census was 815 people.

Demographics 

Economy
The community's economy is tied to the potato farming industry. O'Leary is home to the Canadian Potato Museum.

Climate

References

External links 

Communities in Prince County, Prince Edward Island
Towns in Prince Edward Island